The Border Inn is a motel on the Utah/Nevada border in Baker, Nevada on U.S. 6/U.S. 50.  It is located near Great Basin National Park.

This motel is unique because while the motel rooms are in Utah, and on Mountain Time, the office, restaurant, and casino are in Nevada, and Pacific Time.  The motel also serves as the housing facilities for the seasonal park rangers of the nearby Great Basin National Park.

See also
 List of motels

External links
Border Inn
Border Inn Location in Baker, Nevada

Motels in the United States
Hotels in Utah
Restaurants in Nevada
Casinos in Nevada
Casino hotels